Robert George Freer is an American set decorator. He won two Primetime Emmy Awards and was nominated for a third in the category Outstanding Art Direction for his work on the television programs Centennial, The Gangster Chronicles and Tales of the Gold Monkey.

References

External links 

Living people
Place of birth missing (living people)
Year of birth missing (living people)
American set decorators
Primetime Emmy Award winners